Andrew Lewis (December 14, 1970 – May 4, 2015) was a Guyanese professional boxer in the Middleweight division and the WBA World Welterweight Champion. He also competed in the men's welterweight event at the 1992 Summer Olympics.

Personal life
On June 5, 2007 his uncle Abdel Nur surrendered in Trinidad as a suspect in the John F. Kennedy International Airport terror plot. Lewis called his uncle a good Muslim and said he couldn't believe his uncle was involved in the plot. "It must be the wrong person," and also said  "My uncle was never into terrorism. He condemned the World Trade Center attacks"

Pro career
Nicknamed "Six Heads", Lewis turned pro in 1993.

WBA Welterweight Championship
Andrew beat James Page in 2001 to capture the Vacant WBA Welterweight Title.  Due to his exciting style and power in both hands, Lewis quickly became a popular fighter on HBO. After defending the title against Larry Marks, he took on Ricardo Mayorga and the bout ended in the 2nd round and was ruled a No contest due to a nasty cut on Lewis caused by accidental headbutt.  Lewis's lost the title in a rematch to Mayorga in 2002 via 5th-round TKO.

WBO Welterweight Championship
In 2003 Lewis challenged WBO Welterweight Champion Antonio Margarito, but was TKO'd in the 2nd round.

Guyanese Light Middleweight Title
From 2005 to 2007 Lewis battled Denny Dalton in a series of 3 fights for the Guyanese Light Middleweight Title.  These fights are most notable due to the controversial and bizarre nature of the ending of the second fight.  Ahead on points in the 7th Round Lewis retired from the fight due to an extreme need to defecate blamed on consumption of a pre-fight milkshake.

Lewis returned to the ring almost 12 months to the day from this embarrassment to defeat Dalton and claim the Guyanese Light Middleweight Title.  This would prove to be the final victory of his career, which ended in October 2008 when he dropped a split decision to Howard Eastman.

Death
On 4 May 2015, Lewis, on his bicycle, collided with a Premio car at Hope on the East Bank of Demerara in Guyana. He later succumbed to his severe head injuries at a local hospital.

See also
List of WBA world champions

References

External links

1970 births
2015 deaths
Welterweight boxers
World boxing champions
Sportspeople from Georgetown, Guyana
Boxers at the 1991 Pan American Games
Pan American Games competitors for Guyana
Guyanese male boxers
Road incident deaths in Guyana
Cycling road incident deaths
Central American and Caribbean Games silver medalists for Guyana
Competitors at the 1990 Central American and Caribbean Games
Olympic boxers of Guyana
Boxers at the 1992 Summer Olympics
Central American and Caribbean Games medalists in boxing
20th-century Guyanese people